Jasiel  is a village in the administrative district of Gmina Gryfice, within Gryfice County, West Pomeranian Voivodeship, in north-western Poland. 

The village has a population of 101.

See also 

 History of Pomerania

References

Jasiel